Mount Gilbert can refer to:
 Mount Gilbert (Alaska) in Alaska, USA
 Mount Gilbert (Chugach Mountains) in Alaska, USA
 Mount Gilbert (Antarctica)
 Mount Gilbert (California) in California, USA
 Mount Gilbert (Nevada) in Nevada, USA
 Mount Gilbert (British Columbia), in the Pacific Ranges of the Coast Mountains
 Mount Gilbert (Northern Ireland), near Belfast